Senator Straub may refer to:

Chester J. Straub (born 1937), New York State Senate
Christian Markle Straub (1804–1860), Pennsylvania State Senate
Robert W. Straub (1920–2002), Oregon State Senate